Vadul-Siret (Ukrainian: Вадул-Сірет) is a railway station in the Chernivtsi Oblast of western Ukraine, 7km north of the Romanian border, on the line south from Chernivtsi.

The station functions as the border control point for crossings between Ukraine and the border transit station at Vicșani railway station (Ukrainian: Вікшань) in Romania. There are immigration and customs controls with passenger platforms for change of trains and there is also gauge change equipment from Ukrainian wide gauge of 1520mm to standard gauge in Romania. 

The Bukovyna (uk) international train service between Ukraine and Bucharest also crossed the border here before its cancelation in 2021.

In November 2022 as part of a joint Romania–Ukraine programme to provide extra rail capacity following the 2022 Russian invasion of Ukraine, six standard gauge and seven broad gauge tracks were reopened for traffic.

See also
Rail transport in Ukraine
Rail transport in Romania
Suceava railway station
List of railway stations in Ukraine

References

External links
Map at Wikimapia

 
Railway stations in Ukraine
Chernivtsi Oblast
Romania–Ukraine border crossings
Buildings and structures in Chernivtsi Oblast